Isocarpha (pearlhead) is a genus of flowering plants in the family Asteraceae. They are native to Mexico, Central America, the West Indies, and northern South America, with the range of one species extending north into the United States.

Classification
Although it is generally assigned to the tribe Eupatorieae, the flowers are unusual for that tribe.  It is believed to have evolved from an ancestor which more closely resembles other Eupatorieae.

 Species
 Isocarpha atriplicifolia (L.) R.Br. ex DC. - 	Chiapas, Guerrero, Cuba, Hispaniola, Central America, Colombia, Venezuela
 Isocarpha fistulosa Keil & Stuessy - Peru, Ecuador
 Isocarpha megacephala Mattf. - eastern Brazil (Bahia, Pernambuco, Paraíba)
 Isocarpha microcephala (DC.) S.F.Blake - Peru, Ecuador
 Isocarpha oppositifolia (L.) Cass. - Mesoamerica, northern South America, West Indies, extreme southern Texas

References

Eupatorieae
Asteraceae genera